BMZ may refer to:

 Federal Ministry for Economic Cooperation and Development (German: Bundesministerium für wirtschaftliche Zusammenarbeit und Entwicklung)
 BMZ Group, a Turkish shipping company
 , an electric-vehicle-battery manufacturer
 Bryansk Machine-Building Plant (Russian: Брянский машиностроительный завод, "БМЗ"), in Bryansk, Russia 
 Byelorussian Steel Works (Russian: Белорусский металлургический завод, Belarusian: Беларускі металургічны завод, "БМЗ"), in Zhlobin, Belarus
 BMZ Broadcasting, LLC, owner of Florida radio station WLMX (FM)
 bmz, ISO 639 code of the Baramu language